Maria Catherine Bertelli (born 6 October 1977) is a British volleyball player and former footballer. She competed for the Great Britain volleyball team at the 2012 Summer Olympics.

Football career

Bertelli played football for Wimbledon and Charlton Athletic in the FA Women's Premier League. In 2005, she was signed by Charlton coach Keith Boanas. That season she played in Charlton's 2–1 Premier League Cup final win over Arsenal. In 2006–07 Charlton were beaten 4–1 by quadruple-winning Arsenal in the FA Women's Cup final, before a record crowd of 24,529 at the City Ground in Nottingham. Bertelli was booked for an early foul on Kelly Smith.

When Charlton Athletic men's team were relegated in 2007 they ditched their women's team. Bertelli made public her disappointment: "To call it upsetting is an understatement." She decided to focus on volleyball, joining Great Britain's national training programme in Sheffield in preparation for the 2012 London Olympics.

References

External links
 Profile at Sky Sports

English women's volleyball players
Volleyball players at the 2012 Summer Olympics
Olympic volleyball players of Great Britain
1977 births
Living people
Charlton Athletic W.F.C. players
FA Women's National League players
English women's footballers
Sportspeople from Ashton-under-Lyne
English expatriate sportspeople in Switzerland
Liberos
Setters (volleyball)
Women's association football defenders
Stockport County L.F.C. players